Zakaria Taher Sumon is a Bangladesh Nationalist Party politician and the former Member of Parliament of Comilla-7.

Career
Sumon was elected to parliament from Comilla-7 as a Bangladesh Nationalist Party candidate in 2004 by election. The by-election was called following the death of Abu Taher, sumon's father and incumbent Member of Parliament. He provided an office to former Prime Minister Khaleda Zia to use as the Office of the Chairperson of Bangladesh Nationalist Party in Gulshan in October 2008.

References

Bangladesh Nationalist Party politicians
Living people
8th Jatiya Sangsad members
Year of birth missing (living people)